Blandswood is small settlement in the South Canterbury region. It is near the town of Peel Forest. Various popular walking tracks including Rata Falls and Little Mount Peel in the Peel Forest Park Scenic Reserve begin in Blandswood.

History

1975 Flood 
Following an extremely large and localised period of rainfall, floodwaters and debris breached the banks of the nearby Kowhai River. This flowed through the settlement, taking the lives of four children who were staying at a nearby holiday home.

Reference List 

Timaru District
Populated places in Canterbury, New Zealand